Megchelen is a village in the Dutch province of Gelderland. It is a tiny hook of land surrounded on three sides by the German border in the municipality of Oude IJsselstreek, about 7 km southeast of the town of Ulft on the Zwanenburgseweg.

List of Rijksmonuments in Megchelen
Megchelen is home to 7 rijksmonuments.

|}

References

 Gemeente Oude IJsselstreek website

 Populated places in Gelderland
Oude IJsselstreek